Pump Aid is an international non-profit organisation that was set up in 1998. It is headquartered in London and delivers all its services in Africa, mostly in Malawi.  Pump Aid is a WASH (Water, Sanitation and Hygiene) NGO and is part of a worldwide programme committed to the delivery of the UN’s Sustainable Development Goals and the total eradication of water poverty by 2030. 

Pump Aid had offices in Malawi and London, and as of 2018 employed approximately 23 people, 70% of whom were based in Africa. Most of whom are national staff in Malawi trained in well-digging and water-pump installation.

History 

Pump Aid was founded in 1998 by three teachers working in a rural primary school in Zimbabwe. Two of their pupils fell ill from contaminated water and died. These teachers realised the need for health superseded the need for education and so set up Pump Aid to provide wells in rural communities. The Zimbabwe government estimates that 10% of that country's rural population now accesses water through pumps supplied by Pump Aid.

In 2006, Pump Aid began working in Malawi where the bulk of its projects are now based.  Malawi is the sixth poorest country in the world (by GDP per capita) and is ranked 170 (out of 188) on the UN Human Development Index.  85% of Malawi's population is engaged in and relies on rain-fed small-scale farming and only 11% of small-scale farmers have access to any form of irrigation.

In recent years Pump Aid has moved away from simply installing pumps and now sees improved access to water as part of a broader context which includes, hygiene and sanitation, food and nutrition, access to education and economic independence. Pump Aid recognises that functionality is a key issue in assuring sustainability and delivering value for money and have adapted their community based approach to meet the functionality challenge.

Self-supply 

Pump Aid has been trialling a different approach to reducing water poverty called self-supply, through which individuals are encouraged to invest in improvements to their own water supplies.

Pilot Project

Pump Aid received funding from UNICEF to pilot this approach in an agricultural district of Malawi called Kasungu and provided intensive support to a group of 25 local entrepreneurs, encouraging them to set up financially sustainable small businesses supplying a range of water products and services to three core markets: households, communities and small-scale farmers.

The results of the pilot were astonishing and, in barely twelve months of training, by digging wells, installing household pumps and repairing community pumps that had ceased to function, these 25 entrepreneurs delivered improved access to safe water to 21,614 people and had proved that, by the creation of a network of small businesses, pump functionality can be massively improved.  Pump functionality in their delivery area increased from less than 55% to better than 95% and all this was delivered at a cost of around £12 per individual gaining access to water (including all start-up costs). This is less than half the cost of a traditional rural small community water point.

This programme demonstrated a clear demand for households to own their own water points and for farmers to secure a reliable source of water for irrigation and, among the many accolades it received, it was awarded the International Aid and Development Award at the 2017 UK Charity Awards.

Early Childhood Development - CBCCs 
Early in 2015 Pump Aid began working in rural pre-schools (known in Malawi as Community Based Childcare Centres - CBCCs), which are a key element of the government's Childhood Development Strategy. There are over 9,000 of these in Malawi, but fewer than 25% have access to safe water or basic sanitation facilities, exposing young children to life-threatening risks of water-borne diseases like diarrhoea.

Rural WASH 

Pump Aid's improved access to rural WASH programme is based around its own unique take on a traditional rope and washer pump known as the Elephant Pump.

Elephant Pump

The Elephant Pump, based on a 3,000-year-old Chinese design, is a built using materials that can all be sourced locally and has very few moveable (and therefore breakable) parts.  The name "Elephant Pump" refers to the pump's strength, shape, and reliability and the simplicity of its design means that, if it breaks (as pumps in Africa frequently do), 50% of breakages can be fixed within a day and 90% within four days.

The Elephant Pump's design won the 1995 St Andrews Prize for the Environment for Pump Aid and, in 2006, the World Bank awarded Pump Aid a grant of  US$120,000 funding 1,000 pumps and enabling the development of the Elephant Toilet. The Elephant Pump has now provided clean, safe water to over 1.35 million people living in rural areas of Zimbabwe Liberia and Malawi.

Urban waste 
In September 2015, Pump Aid began a Comic Relief match-funded programme in Blantyre, which sought to engage the local private sector in the provision of safe water, hygienic sanitation and waste recycling in the informal settlements that surround that city.  In 2016 this programme expanded into Lilongwe. Pump Aid initiated this urban project after seeing a need for clean water in the informal settlements around Blantyre and Lilongwe, which are not served by local water boards. The programme supports local entrepreneurs to sell water filters and recycle waste in order to make a living. By integrating WASH with other sectors such as agriculture and business, Pump Aid is able to maximise its impact on a community.

Ambassador 

International musician Corinne Bailey Rae has been a Goodwill Ambassador for Pump Aid since 2007. Corinne visited a Pump Aid project in Malawi in 2007.  "I didn't realise just how amazing this organisation was until I went to Malawi in September," she told The Guardian. "We were brought up thinking of Africa as this dry, 'cursed' continent, but there is water - you just have to go down deep enough to find it."  More recently she has represented Pump Aid by delivering their Radio 4 Appeal in January 2017.

Lord Jack McConnell is also a keen ambassador for Pump Aid.  He was elected an MSP in the first Scottish Parliament elections in 1999, becoming First Minister in 2001.  In 2007, he was appointed an adviser to the Clinton Hunter Development Initiative in Malawi and Rwanda and in 2008 was appointed by Gordon Brown as the Prime Minister's Special Representative on Conflict Resolution Mechanisms.  He became a member of the House of Lords in 2010 where he committed himself to continuing his work to tackle poverty in Africa and to developing the relationship between Scotland and Malawi.

Awards and recognition
 Winner of the 2005 and 2008 "St Andrews Prize for the Environment"

References

Water and the environment
Development charities based in the United Kingdom
Water-related charities
Foreign charities operating in Malawi
Organisations based in the London Borough of Hackney